Longitarsus weisei is a species of beetle from Chrysomelidae family.

Distribution
The species can be found in Europe, including countries like Albania, France, Germany, Spain, Switzerland, the Netherlands, and South Poland. It can also be found in Asia, including Afghanistan, Iraq, Iran, Tajikistan, Turkey, and West China. And in the Asian part of Russia, in Siberia, or more precisely, Yakutsk.

References

Beetles described in 1895
W
Beetles of Asia
Beetles of Europe